State ECU (also known as State Employees Credit Union of New Mexico or SECU New Mexico) is a federal not-for-profit credit union headquartered in Santa Fe, New Mexico.  As of 2019, State ECU has $569 million in assets, over 48,000 members, and eight branches in the New Mexico.  Deposits by the members are regulated and insured by National Credit Union Administration (NCUA) under latter's western region jurisdiction.

History 
State Employees Credit Union was formed in 1958 to serve the following counties of Bernalillo, Doña Ana, Rio Arriba, Sandoval, Santa Fe, San Miguel, or Valencia.

In 2016, it got a new logo and a shortened name -"State ECU"; to distinguish itself from other states' SECUs.

Community support programs 
To overcome the on-going COVID-19 pandemic in New Mexico, State ECU created the State ECU Covid Relief Fund to support local businesses and nonprofits.

References

External links
Official website

Credit unions based in New Mexico
Non-profit organizations based in New Mexico
Banks established in 1958
Organizations established in 1958